The 1795 Delaware gubernatorial election was held on October 6, 1795.

Incumbent Federalist Governor Joshua Clayton was not eligible for re-election under the Delaware Constitution of 1792. 

Federalist nominee Gunning Bedford Sr. defeated Democratic-Republican nominee Archibald Alexander with 52.34% of the vote.

General election

Results

References

Bibliography
 
 
 

1795
Delaware
Gubernatorial